is a Japanese politician and doctor, who served as Minister of the Environment in Yasuo Fukuda's cabinet.

Born in Adachi, Tokyo, he graduated from Nihon University, earning a medical degree. In 1993, he was elected for the first time as a member of the Japan New Party. In December 1997, he joined the Liberal Democratic Party. He represented Tokyo's 13th district in the House of Representatives.

References 

1949 births
Living people
People from Adachi, Tokyo
Nihon University alumni
20th-century Japanese physicians
Members of the House of Representatives (Japan)
Environment ministers of Japan
Liberal Democratic Party (Japan) politicians
Japan New Party politicians
21st-century Japanese politicians